Rubokht (also Romanized as Rūbokht; also known as Robakht, Rovokht, and Rowvokht) is a village in Alqurat Rural District, in the Central District of Birjand County, South Khorasan Province, Iran. At the 2006 census, its population was 166, in 60 families.

References 

Populated places in Birjand County